Turtles All the Way Down is a young adult novel written by American author John Green. The novel was published on October 10, 2017 by Dutton Books. It is Green's fifth solo novel, and his seventh overall. Its publication was announced during VidCon 2017, the online video conference co-founded by Green and his brother Hank. It was his first published work since his 2012 novel The Fault in Our Stars. The novel debuted at number 1 on the New York Times bestseller list in the category of "Young Adult Hardcover Books". It stayed at the top of the list for 15 weeks and remained on the list for 62 weeks. In December 2017, Green announced that a film adaptation was in development, with filming beginning in April 2022 after years in development hell.

Background 
The story centers on 16-year-old Aza Holmes, an American high school student with OCD and anxiety, and her search for a fugitive billionaire who happens to be a neighbor's father. She is grieving the loss of her own father while a budding relationship grows between her and the billionaire's son. Additionally, the novel explores Aza's relationship with her best friend, Daisy. The only other details of the plot revealed to the public before release were that it was to contain, either literally or figuratively, a tuatara, Star Wars fan fiction, an unexpected reunion, friendship, and values of life.

Speaking about the novel, Green stated: "This is my first attempt to write directly about the kind of mental illness that has affected my life since childhood, so while the story is fictional, it is also quite personal."

Plot summary
Aza Holmes is a 16-year-old high school student living in Indianapolis who struggles with OCD, which often manifests as a fear of the human microbiome. Constantly worried about infection, particularly by C. diff, she repeatedly opens a never-fully-healed callus on her finger in an effort to drain out what she believes are pathogens. Throughout the book, Aza is accompanied by two close friends: Mychal Turner, an aspiring artist, and her best friend Daisy Ramirez, who writes Star Wars fan fiction.

One day at school, Daisy discovers that Russell Pickett, a billionaire construction magnate and the father of one of Aza's old friends, Davis Pickett, has gone missing in the wake of corporate crime investigations. Russell's wife had died years prior, so Russell's disappearance leaves Davis and his younger brother Noah with no formal guardian. Tempted by the reward of $100,000 for information leading to Pickett's arrest, Daisy takes Aza on a search for the missing billionaire. After canoeing down the White River and sneaking onto the Pickett property, they are caught by a security guard who brings them to meet Davis.

To persuade the two girls to stop pursuing the elder Pickett, Davis gives Aza $100,000 taken from his father's various stashes around the guest house, which she splits with Daisy. After the meeting, Davis and Aza begin dating and, at the same time, Daisy becomes romantically involved with Mychal. As time passes, Aza comes to believe that she cannot overcome her anxiety, preventing her from ever having a normal relationship with Davis. She finds numerous blog posts written by him about his feelings on both his father's disappearance and his relationship with her.

Aza reads Daisy's fan fiction for the first time and discovers that Daisy has been using it as a vent for her frustrations with Aza. She continues to spiral into a panic attack which results in her drinking hand sanitizer and passing out. Their friendship deteriorates, culminating in a heated argument while Aza is driving on the highway that results in a car accident. Aza spends eight days in the hospital, during which she again has a panic attack, due to her fears of C. diff, and drinks sanitizer again, this time being caught by her mother. She recovers and goes on to rekindle her friendship with Daisy. Aza also begins to improve her abilities to manage her compulsions by practicing exposure and response prevention (ERP) and taking new prescriptions.

Later, at an underground art exhibition inside an unfinished drainage tunnel system off of Pogue's Run that Russell Pickett's company was responsible for, Aza and Daisy go exploring on their own. After noticing the stench of putrefaction emanating from the area they realize that this was where Russell Picket had run off to, and they suspect that the billionaire has already died. Aza tells Davis of their discovery, and he makes an anonymous tip to the police. The authorities locate the body, which is later reported to be that of Russell Pickett.

Given the loss of their parents and home, added to the fact that their father had left his entire fortune to his pet tuatara, Davis and  Noah decide to relocate to Colorado, where they have rented a house and will be attending school. As Davis and Aza say their goodbyes, Aza reflects on the open possibilities of her future.

Publication history

A section of the novel was read aloud by Green during the Project for Awesome live stream in December 2016. In order to protect the book's copyright, this section of the live stream was not archived and is no longer available online.

In the months leading up to the novel's announcement, Green left various clues in his weekly Vlogbrothers videos, whereupon some members of Nerdfighteria worked together to solve these hints and reveal more information about the book.

In September, Green posted a video of himself narrating the first chapter of the novel on the Vlogbrothers channel.

The New York Times described the novel and its focus on crippling anxiety as Green's most personal book yet. Upon the release of his book, he and his brother Hank Green went on a book tour.

Critical reception
Within hours of the novel's announcement, press outlets including Associated Press, BuzzFeed, Bustle, Publishers Weekly, Mashable, MTV, Entertainment Weekly and Cultura Magazine published press releases echoing the announcement, signaling a high level of anticipation.

The book debuted to positive reviews. The New York Times praised it as "surprising and moving" and wrote that "one needn't be suffering like Aza to identify with it. One need only be human." Many reviewers noted Green's talent for keen observation, sharpened more in this case by Green's own struggles with OCD, the mental illness depicted in the novel. Several reviewers referenced a dismissive perception of Green's now very popular œuvre as "sad teen books", which emerged since the popularity of The Fault in Our Stars, but praised Turtles All the Way Down as truthful and authentic enough to transcend these imagined drawbacks. "It often dwells in cliché, but only as pop songs and epic poems do, mining the universal to create something that speaks to the familiar rhythms of the heart," wrote Matt Haig of The Guardian, "It might just be a new modern classic."

Film adaptation

In December 2017, Green announced that a film adaptation was in development. It was optioned by Fox 2000 and would be produced by Temple Hill Productions, the same team that made The Fault in Our Stars and Paper Towns adaptations. In May 2018, Green confirmed that Isaac Aptaker and Elizabeth Berger, the co-showrunners of the NBC series This Is Us and the screenwriters of Love, Simon, would be adapting the novel. Actress Hannah Marks was named as the film's director in January 2019. After Fox 2000 was closed as part of the acquisition of 21st Century Fox by Disney, the film was put on hold. In March 2022, it was announced the film had switched studios to New Line Cinema and would be released on the streaming service HBO Max. The film is set to star Isabela Merced and begin filming in April 2022. Green and Rosianna Halse Rojas will serve as executive producers.

From April to May 2022 it was announced that Cree Cicchino, Felix Mallard, J. Smith-Cameron, Poorna Jagannathan, and Maliq Johnson would also appear in the film.

References

2017 American novels
American novels adapted into films
American young adult novels
Books with cover art by Rodrigo Corral
Dutton Penguin books
Novels about dysfunctional families
Novels about friendship
Novels about obsessive–compulsive disorder
Novels by John Green (author)
Novels set in high schools and secondary schools
Novels set in Indianapolis